Nothoclavulina is a genus of fungus in the family Tricholomataceae. The genus is monotypic, containing the single species Nothoclavulina ditopa, described by American mycologist Rolf Singer in 1970. The species, found in Argentina, is an anamorphic version of the genus Arthrosporella. The generic name Nothoclavulina is Latin for "false Clavulina".

Description
The surface is pulverulent—as if covered with a fine white powder. There are no basidia, basidiospores, nor clamp connections present in the hyphae. The fungus produces arthrospores, specialized uninucleate cells that function like a spore and formed vegetatively. The arthrospores have thin walls, and are hyaline (translucent) and smooth. The fungus is the anamorph (asexual stage) of the species Arthrosporella ditopa; the arthroconidia are produced directly on the stem of that species to give it a powdery appearance.

Habitat and distribution
The fungus was found by Singer in the late autumn of 1949, growing on rotting leaves and humus in subtropical forests dominated by Myrtaceae species, in the northwestern province of Tucumán in Argentina. Found at an altitude , nearby plants in the area were from several genera, including Boehmeria, Duranta, Eugenia, Phoebe, and Piptadenia.

See also

 List of Tricholomataceae genera

References

Tricholomataceae
Monotypic Agaricales genera
Fungi of South America
Taxa named by Rolf Singer